Louis-Georges-Oudard-Feudrix de Bréquigny (22 February 1714 – 3 July 1795), was a French scholar. He was born at Granville, Manche in Normandy.

His first publications were anonymous: a History of the Revolutions of Genoa up to the Peace of 1748 (1750), and a series of Lives of the Greek Orators (1752). In 1754 he was given the task of completing the work of Eusèbe de Laurière, later continued by Denis-François Secousse, on the Ordonnances des Rois de France de la 3e Race. Secousse had published nine volumes and Bréquigny published five more up to 1790. In 1811, Emmanuel de Pastoret published the last eleven volumes. Elected a member of the Académie des Inscriptions et Belles-Lettres in 1759, he contributed a History of Postumus, Emperor of the Gauls (vol. XXX, 1760) to the collected works of that illustrious society, and also a Dissertation on the Establishment of the Religion and Empire of Muhammad (vol. XXXII, 1761–1763).

After the close of the Seven Years' War he was sent to search in the archives of Great Britain for documents bearing upon the history of France, more particularly upon that of the French provinces which once belonged to England. A useful selection of these documents was published (unfortunately without adequate critical treatment) by Jacques Joseph Champollion-Figeac, under the title Letters of Kings, Queens and Other Persons of the Courts of France and England, from Louis VII to Henry IV (collection of Unpublished Documents Relating to the History of France, 2 vols., 1839, 1847).

Bréquigny himself drew the material for many important studies from the rich mine which he had thus exploited. These were included in the collection of the :
 Dissertation on the Differences between France and England during the Reign of Charles the Fair (vol. XLI)
 Dissertation on the Life of Mary, Queen of France, Sister of Henry VIII, King of England (vol. XLII)
four Dissertations to Serve the History of the Town of Calais (vols. XLIII and L)
 Dissertation on the Negotiations Concerning the Marriage Plans of Elizabeth, Queen of England, First with the Duke of Anjou, Then with the Duke of Alençon, Both Brothers of King Charles IX of France (vol. I)

This last was read to the Academy on 22 January 1793, the morrow of Louis XVI's execution. Meanwhile, Bréquigny had taken part in three great and erudite works.

To the Chronological Table of Diplomas, Charters, Letters, and Printed Acts Concerning the History of France he contributed three volumes in collaboration with Mouchet (1769–1783). Charged with the supervision of a large collection of documents bearing on French history, analogous to Rymer's , he published the first volume (Diplomas, Charters, Letters, and Other Documents Relating to French Affairs, etc., in Latin: , 1791). The Revolution interrupted him in his collection of Dissertations Concerning the History, Sciences, Letters, and Arts of the Chinese ), begun in 1776 at the instance of the minister Bertin, when fifteen volumes had appeared.

See the note on Bréquigny at the end of vol. IV of the Chronological Table of Diplomas (1836); Champollion-Figeac's preface to the Letters of Kings and Queens; the Committee of Historical Works, by X. Charmes, vol. I passim; N. Oursel, New Norman Biography (1886); and the Catalogue of Manuscripts of the Duchesne and Bréquigny Collections (in the Bibliothèque Nationale), by René Poupardin (1905).

References

1714 births
1795 deaths
People from Manche
Members of the Académie Française
Members of the Académie des Inscriptions et Belles-Lettres